Curvy Kate is a lingerie brand specialising in D – K cup Bras and Swimwear. They are currently based in Uxbridge, London. Curvy Kate lingerie is designed for the curvy woman and for small back sizes through to plus size bras with back bands from a 28" – 44". They officially launched in July 2009 at the Harrogate Lingerie Show.

Curvy Kate do not use professional models. They instead run an annual modelling competition called "Star In A Bra" to look for customer role models with a D+ cup size. Their stance for using real sized models and ethnic models has been warmly received by the lingerie industry. Since 2008 the winners have been: Emma Tabor (2008)  
Lauren Colfer (2009) 
Laura Ann Smith (2010)
Lizzie Haines (2011) 
Sophie Morgan (2012)
Lotte Williams (2013) and Sophia Adams (2015).

In November 2015, Curvy Kate announced the launch of their new brand Scantilly in DD – HH cup sizes.

Awards
2011
 Full Bust Brand of the Year – UK Lingerie Awards

2012
 Full Bust Brand of the Year – UK Lingerie Awards
 Best Marketing Campaign – UK Lingerie Awards

2014
 Lingerie and Beachwear Brand of the Year – UK Lingerie Awards
 Womenswear Brand of the Year – Drapers Awards

2015
 Marketing Campaign of the Year – UK Lingerie Awards

References

External links 

Official Curvy Kate website

Companies based in the London Borough of Harrow
Lingerie brands